Salvia leucophylla, the San Luis purple sage, purple sage, or gray sage, is an aromatic sage native to the southern coastal mountain ranges of the Californias.

Description

The leaves are a light green in the spring, turning grayish-white as they mature, with graceful branches that arch to the ground, sometimes rooting when they touch the ground. The  flowers are pinkish-purple, held in a purple-tinged gray calyx.

Taxonomy 
The plant's specific epithet, leucophylla, describes the light grayish leaves. The type specimen was collected near Santa Barbara, California, by Scottish botanist David Douglas and named by Edward Lee Greene in 1892. The common names refer to the pale purple flowers (purple sage) or to the grayish leaves (gray sage).

Distribution and habitat 
The plant is native to the southern coastal mountain ranges of California and Baja California, typically being found on dry hillsides and in gravelly soils.

Cultivation
The species is widely used in California and xeriscape gardening, preferring full sun and good drainage. There are many cultivars, natural hybrids, and wild hybrids with other Salvia species, making clear naming very confusing.

Some cultivars include:
Salvia leucophylla 'Pt. Sal'
Salvia leucophylla 'Figueroa'
Salvia leucophylla 'Bee's Bliss'

Salvia leucophylla is known to have allelopathic qualities. It is thought that monoterpenoids released from the plant may be responsible for inhibiting the growth of neighboring seedlings.

References

External links

Jepson Flora Project: Salvia leucophylla
Salvia leucophylla - Images @ CalPhoto archives

leucophylla
Flora of California
Flora of Baja California
Natural history of the California chaparral and woodlands
Natural history of the Santa Monica Mountains
Natural history of the Transverse Ranges
Natural history of the California Coast Ranges
Natural history of the San Francisco Bay Area
Plants described in 1892
Butterfly food plants
Garden plants of North America
Drought-tolerant plants
Flora without expected TNC conservation status